The Sevom Khordad or 3rd Khordad is an Iranian road-mobile medium range air defense missile system that was first unveiled on 11 May 2014. It is believed to be an upgraded version of the Ra'ad air defense system and somewhat superior to the other version of Ra'ad, Tabas (air defense system), although it is more similar to the Ra'ad then the Tabas is. Its operational capabilities were confirmed when it shot down an American Northrop Grumman RQ-4 Global Hawk near the Strait of Hormuz. It is named after the Liberation of Khorramshahr which occurred on 3rd Khordad on the Persian Calendar.

Characteristics
It shows somewhat resemblance to the Buk-M2. In terms of performance, it is "often compared to the Russian Buk family." Each Sevom Khordad TELAR can carry 3 Taer-2B missiles which have range of 50–105 km and can operate at altitudes of 25–30 km. The Sevom Khordad utilizes an X-band Active Phased array engagement radar, each 3rd Khordad TELAR can simultaneously detect 100 targets, engage 4 and guide 2 missiles on a target. Each battery of Sevom Khordad Battery consists of one TELAR and two TELs and hence has 9 ready-to fire missiles, each battalion has four batteries and hence can engage 16 targets simultaneously. Each battalion also includes a Bashir 3-D S-band Phased array Surveillance radar which has a detection range of 350 km. The battalion also has a Command and Control (C2) Unit which provides communication with other air defense systems and hence establishes a network of air defenses. It can also provide additional Data link in case of Radar jamming.

Operators
: Islamic Revolutionary Guard Corps Aerospace Force
: Syrian Air Defense Force

References 

Surface-to-air missiles of Iran
21st-century surface-to-air missiles
Weapons and ammunition introduced in 2016
Guided missiles of Iran